Brutal Sports Football is an arcade-style football video game developed by Teque London and originally published by Millennium Interactive for the Commodore Amiga in 1993. It is the first entry in the Brutal Sports Series franchise, which continued with Wild Cup Soccer in 1994, also from the same development team.

Featuring a different take on football, Brutal Sports Football puts heavy emphasis on the violent aspect of the sport and it resembles war as much as a sports competition. Initially released on the Amiga computers, it was later ported to MS-DOS, Amiga CD32 and Atari Jaguar, with the latter being published by Telegames instead and became the first third-party title released for the system. The Jaguar version was also released in Japan by Messe Sansao in July 1995.

Brutal Sports Football received mostly positive reception since its release on the Amiga, with many reviewers favorably comparing it to Speedball 2: Brutal Deluxe from The Bitmap Brothers.

Gameplay 

Brutal Sports Football is a seven-a-side football game, similar to Mutant League Football, in which it deviates from other american football titles released at the time in several ways. While following the same basic gameplay featured in other football simulators, including the ability of tackling players and lob the oval-shaped football into the goalpost, there are no rules once a match starts and characters not in possession can actually hit opponents with or without the ball and even kill them, resulting in a more bloodier and arcade-styled gameplay approach of the sport. The game also features item and weapon pick-ups randomly scattered across the main playfield that players can use against opponents or affecting them. Each match lasts seven minutes and features two ways of finishing them, by either scoring higher than the other team or killing six of seven teammates from the opposite side. If either requirement is not meet, players go immediately into sudden death, where they have to kill six out of seven opponents in order to win the game.

Modes 
There are 3 modes of play: League, Unfriendly and Knockout, with each one having their own subset of rules. Unfriendly is both the standard single and multiplayer match mode of the game. Knockout is a tournament-style where eight teams battle in the competition. League is the main single-player mode of the game, where the player compete in four league seasons against rival teams. After winning a match, the player earn money depending on their performance in the playfield and its used in lockers where they manage their chosen team, repair a teammate that got the most damage in-game and more. Password is also given after finishing a match to resume progress.

Teams 
The teams are composed of vikings, lizards, goats and rhinos. Only the vikings are playable in both League and Knockout modes, while the lizards, goats and rhinos are only playable in Unfriendly mode. In total, there are eleven teams to choose from, each one having seven players on the field instead of the usual eleven, in addition of their own advantages and disadvantages. However, in League mode, teams have nine players and two of them are substitutional:

The Vikings
 Slayers
 Thugs
 Assassins
 Warlords
 Mad Dogs
 Savages
 Punishers
 Huns
 Berserkers

The Lizards
 Pit Fiends
 Dragons
 Hot Heads

The Wild Goats
 Slashers
 Spikers
 Stompers

The Rhinos
 Marauders
 Mad Herd
 Mammoths

Synopsis 
Brutal Sports Football takes place in a post-apocalyptic futuristic sci-fi world, where genetically engineered bi-pedal robots have replaced humans in the Brutal Football League, which originated as a disguised population control operation. Interest in the sport, however, dwindled because matches did not last longer than two minutes and players quickly growing tired, but one match between two particular teams went as far to the point of obliterating both the arena and the land where the tournament was hosted with a nuclear weapon. Thanks to the invention of robots by Professor I.M. Looney, the league was relaunched after the previous event.

Development and release 
Brutal Sports Football originally entered development in June 1992 for the Amiga after the release of James Pond 3 as a side-scrolling beat 'em up role-playing game hybrid titled Axequest, however artist Anthony Hager stated that although the original project looked like a good game, it would have been "too different to catch on", forcing the team in making an original title but make it "less original" in terms of gameplay and settle down with a sports thematic with beat 'em up elements. The project was originally titled Beastball before being released under its final name.

Ports for both Sega Genesis and Super Nintendo Entertainment System were in development and planned to be published by Spectrum HoloByte in North America and MicroProse in Europe under the name Beastball. Both ports were advertised in late 1993 and listed for a 1994 release, with the Genesis version even being reviewed by GamePro magazine but neither was ultimately released, though a ROM image of the Genesis version was leaked online in 2011 by a video game collector at the SegaAge forums.

Reception 

Brutal Sports Football received mostly positive reception since its release on the Amiga.

Notes

References

External links 
 Brutal Sports Football at AtariAge
 Brutal Sports Football at GameFAQs
 Brutal Sports Football at Giant Bomb
  Brutal Sports Football at MobyGames

1993 video games
American football video games
Amiga games
Amiga 1200 games
Atari Jaguar games
Cancelled Sega Genesis games
Cancelled Super Nintendo Entertainment System games
Amiga CD32 games
DOS games
Fantasy sports video games
Multiplayer and single-player video games
Piko Interactive games
Post-apocalyptic video games
Science fiction video games
Sports fiction
Telegames games
Teque London games
Video games developed in the United Kingdom
Video games set in the future